Via Narenta, sometimes also Via Bosna or neretvanski put, was a medieval trade route through the Dinaric Alps that connected Dubrovnik (Republic of Ragusa) through the Neretva river valley with the Bosna river valley, and from there to various places in medieval Bosnia and the rest of the Balkans.

The route went through Drijeva (an intersection near today's Gabela), following the river up to Prenj and Konjic, where it turned northward to Visoko.

It was one of the two main routes from Bosnia to Dubrovnik; the other was Via Drine that reached the Drina.

References

Sources
 
 

Former trade routes
Economy of the Republic of Ragusa
Medieval Bosnia and Herzegovina
Medieval roads and tracks
Economic history of Bosnia and Herzegovina